Blastobasis glandulella is a species of moth of the family Blastobasidae. It is found in the  eastern United States and southern Ontario, Canada. It has also been recorded in California. In Europe, it has been recorded from Austria, Germany, the Czech Republic, Italy, Slovakia and Croatia.

It is commonly known as the acorn moth, but this can also refer to the tortrix moth Cydia splendana from Europe.

The wingspan is 15–25 mm. Adults have gray to grayish-brown forewings with a pale diffuse line bordered distally by dark band. There is also a black median dot and two black reniform dots, which form a triangle. The terminal line is composed of dark dots. The hindwings are shiny gray with dark veins and a fringe of long hair-like scales. They are on wing from April to September.

The larvae feed inside acorns and chestnuts.

References

External links
mothphotographersgroup
 Images representing Blastobasis glandulella  at Consortium for the Barcode of Life

Moths described in 1871
Blastobasis
Moths of Europe